Craugastor phasma is a species of frog in the family Craugastoridae. It is endemic to southeastern Costa Rica and only known from its type locality in the Las Tablas protected area in the Puntarenas Province, near the Panamanian border. Only a single individual—the holotype collected in 1992—has ever been observed. It is unusual in its ghost-like, gray-white coloration, and it was initially thought that the specimen was an albino form of some other species. However, the specimen is also morphologically distinct, although some uncertainty regarding the validity of this species remains.

Etymology
The specific name phasma is Greek for "apparition" or "spirit" and refers to the ghost-like appearance of this species.

Taxonomy and systematics
Based on morphological data, Savage and colleagues (2004) suggested that the sister species of Craugastor phasma is Craugastor talamancae, a lowland species. Later studies have grouped Craugastor phasma with montane species in the Craugastor melanostictus species group.

Description
The holotype, an adult female, measures  in snout–vent length. Apart from the black eyes and scattered black markings on the head and hind limbs, the dorsal and ventral surfaces are uniformly gray-white. Skin is smooth. The head is slightly broader than it is wide. The snout is obtuse in profile. The canthus rostralis is sharp. The tympanum is ovoid and distinct. The fingers and toes bear disks. The toes have basal webbing.

Habitat and conservation
The site was part of a transect that was regularly monitored for two years, but no other specimens were observed.

The type locality is within the La Amistad Biosphere Reserve. However, the holotype was sick and observed among dead and dying frogs, so disease is a possible, immediate threat to this species.

References

phasma
Amphibians of Costa Rica
Endemic fauna of Costa Rica
Amphibians described in 1996
Taxa named by Jay M. Savage
Taxonomy articles created by Polbot